The Slovenia women's national under-20 volleyball team represents Slovenia in international women's volleyball competitions under the age of 20 and is controlled by the Volleyball Federation of Slovenia, which is an affiliate of the Federation of International Volleyball (FIVB) and also a part of the European Volleyball Confederation (CEV).

Results

FIVB U21 World Championship
 Champions   Runners up   Third place   Fourth place

Europe Junior Championship
 Champions   Runners up   Third place   Fourth place

Team

Current squad
The Following players is the Slovenian players that Competed in the 2018 Women's U19 Volleyball European Championship

References

External links
Official website
FIVB profile

Volleyball
National women's under-20 volleyball teams
Volleyball in Slovenia